Ulrica of Sweden or Wulfrica, Wolferica - Swedish: Ulrika - may refer to:

Ulrika Eleonora of Denmark or Ulrica Eleanor, Queen consort of Sweden 1680
Ulrika Eleonora of Sweden or Ulrica Eleanor, Queen regnant of Sweden 1718
Louisa Ulrika of Prussia or Louise Ulrica, Queen consort of Sweden 1751